Esplanade Mall may refer to 
The Esplanade (Kenner, Louisiana)
Esplanade Mall (Oxnard, California)